Kinu or KINU may refer to:

Kinu-gawa, a river in Japan
Kinu, a warship in the Imperial Japanese Navy
Kinu, a village in Iran
KINU (FM), a radio station (89.9 FM) licensed to serve Kotzebue, Alaska, United States